Robert J. ("Bob") Geary is a former officer in the San Francisco Police Department who gained notoriety as the subject of a ballot initiative to allow him to take his ventriloquist's dummy, Brendan O'Smarty, on foot patrol.

Early life
Geary holds an undergraduate degree in art, and a master's degree in education. He earned four Medals of Valor. He was a member of AFTRA and the Screen Actors' Guild, having worked as a hand model and starring opposite Don Johnson in a 1981 television movie, The Two Lives of Carol Letner.

In the 1980s he became a favorite subject of columnist Herb Caen, after he wrote a letter to the editor of the San Francisco Chronicle defending the police department for issuing too many tickets to taxicabs. Officer Geary was found "not guilty" of writing too many tickets at a public event held in a North Beach theater that featured a stripper in the role of bailiff.

Ballot initiatives
In 1988, San Francisco police attempted for budgetary reasons to end its historic horse patrol program for which Geary's then-girlfriend served as a mounted police officer.  Geary sponsored a ballot initiative to save the program, which passed with 86 percent of the local vote, the highest margin of any to date in the city.

In 1991 Geary was assigned to a community policing position in North Beach. The program encouraged officers to be "highly visible" and use "creative and ingenious methods" to earn the trust of local civilians.  Geary decided to order an expensive wooden dummy out of a ventriloquist catalog. He bought an audiotape program to teach himself to use the dummy, practicing in front of a bathroom mirror.  Geary chose the name "Smarty" as a pun on the word "Dummy," and the full name "Brendan O'Smarty" to add dignity to the doll.  Geary took the dummy to entertain children while he was on patrol, dressing it in a police uniform with badge number 1/2 and a water pistol.  Despite carrying the dummy, Geary was able to function as an officer, chasing and tackling at least one suspect with dummy in hand.

In 1992, San Francisco mayor Frank Jordan named a relatively unknown police officer, Anthony B. ("Tony") Ribera, to become chief of police. The previous chief, Richard Hongisto, was fired after only six weeks on the job for ordering his officers to destroy copies of the San Francisco Bay Times that had lampooned him over what the paper considered a heavy-handed police response to an outbreak of rioting following the Rodney King police brutality verdict.  Whereas Hongisto had tolerated Brendan O'Smarty, Ribera ordered Geary to keep the dummy in his police car while he went out on patrol. Despite an internal appeal and some press coverage, the department refused to rescind the order. The board of supervisors passed resolution urging the mayor to override the police chief, but he refused.

In 1993 Geary formed the "Committee to Save Puppet Officer Brendan O'Smarty," which collected nearly 10,000 signatures in a self-financed campaign to bring the matter to a local referendum.  The measure was designated and certified for the general election in November, 1993, the last of 28 ballot measures.  The ballot's wording was:
Shall it be the policy of the people of San Francisco to allow Police Officer Bob Geary to decide when he may use his puppet Brendan O'Smarty while on duty?
Despite opposition from the police chief and others who considered the referendum an embarrassment, the measure passed by a narrow 51% to 49% margin. Geary continued to use the puppet throughout the 1990s and became, in addition to a local phenomenon, a celebrity at ventriloquist conventions nationwide, and appearing in the 2000 documentary, Dummies!

Tax lawsuit

Soon after the election Geary attempted to take an $11,500 tax deduction over the funds he spent on the ballot measure, calling them an "advertising expense" to offset $10,000 paid him by Interscope Communications for work on developing a screenplay over the ballot affair.  The Internal Revenue Service objected in 1995, and filed a notice of deficiency in 1997.  The case drew nationwide attention, bringing appearances for Geary on Prime Time Live and Comedy Central.  In its own public relations effort the IRS issued a number of humorous statements, saying among other things, "when it comes to taxes, Officer O'Smarty is a dummy."

In 2000 the United States Tax Court ruled against Geary, reversing the deduction and assessing back taxes and "accuracy" penalties, on the basis that expenditures spent on political causes such as ballot initiatives are disallowed under Internal Revenue Code section 162(e), even if they would otherwise be deductible under other sections of the code. The Ninth Circuit Court of Appeals later upheld that decision but reversed the accuracy penalties because Geary had taken the deductions in good faith.

Retirement

In 1998 the police department named a horse for Geary.  In 2000 Geary sued an advertising agency for using his likeness to promote the Colorado Lottery.

Officer Geary and Brendan O'Smarty retired from the police force in 2000.  Then-mayor Willie Brown declared the day "Officer Geary Day."  For his last day Geary went on patrol in a Wells-Fargo stagecoach drawn by four horses.

External links
Memo opinion - tax court ruling denying deduction

References

San Francisco Police Department officers
Culture of San Francisco
Living people
American performance artists
Year of birth missing (living people)